EXSLT is a community initiative to provide extensions to XSLT, which are broken down into a number of modules, listed below.

The creators (Jeni Tennison, Uche Ogbuji, Jim Fuller, Dave Pawson, et al.) of EXSLT aim to encourage the implementers of XSLT processors to use these extensions, in order to increase the portability of stylesheets.

List of functions

Common EXSLT 

Common covers common, basic extension elements and functions.

Math EXSLT 

Math covers extension elements and functions that provide facilities to do with mathematics.

Sets EXSLT 

Sets covers those extension elements and functions that provide facilities to do with set manipulation.

Dates and Times EXSLT 

Dates and Times covers date and time-related extension elements and functions.

Strings EXSLT 

Strings covers extension elements and functions that provide facilities to do with string manipulation.

Regular Expressions EXSLT 

Regular Expressions covers extension elements and functions that provide facilities to do with regular expressions.

Dynamic EXSLT 

Dynamic covers extension elements and functions that deal with the dynamic evaluation of strings containing XPath expressions.

Random EXSLT 

Random covers extension elements and functions that provide facilities to do with randomness.

External links 

 
 EXSLT Tools

XML-based standards
Markup languages
Functional languages